Jeong Gi-hun (born 1974) is a South Korean film director and screenwriter. Jeong made his debut with the hit dramedy film Goodbye Mom (2009), which received numerous nominations and awards, including Best Director for Asian New Talent Award at the 2010 Shanghai International Film Festival. His second feature, the romantic drama Love 911 (2012), was also a box office hit.

Filmography 
My Dear Keum-hong (1995) - directing dept
A Promise (1998) - 1st assistant director
Wild Card (2003) - 1st assistant director
Death Bell (2008) - colorist, script editor
Goodbye Mom (2009) - director, screenwriter
Love 911 (2012) - director, screenwriter
You Call It Passion (2015) - director, screenwriter

Awards 
2010 13th Shanghai International Film Festival: Best Director for Asian New Talent Award (Goodbye Mom)

References

External links 
 
 
 

1974 births
Living people
South Korean film directors
South Korean screenwriters